Zika virus outbreak may refer to:

2015–2016 Zika virus epidemic
Zika virus outbreak timeline
2013–2014 Zika virus outbreaks in Oceania
2007 Yap Islands Zika virus outbreak